Amannus is a genus of beetles in the family Cerambycidae, containing the following species:

 Amannus atriplicis Linsley, 1957
 Amannus pectoralis LeConte, 1858
 Amannus vittiger LeConte, 1858

References

Trachyderini
Cerambycidae genera